The Lost Chapter of the Acts of the Apostles, also known as the Sonnini Manuscript, is a short text purporting to be the translation of a manuscript containing the 29th chapter of the Acts of the Apostles, detailing Paul the Apostle's journey to Britannia, where he preached to a tribe of Israelites on "Mount Lud" (Ludgate Hill), later the site of St Paul's Cathedral, and met with Druids, who proved to him that they were descended from Jews. Thereafter, Paul preached in Gaul and Belgium, and then to Switzerland (Helvetia), where a miraculous earthquake occurred at the site of Pontius Pilate's supposed suicide.

The canonical book of Acts ends rather abruptly with Paul kept under house arrest in chapter 28, which has led to various theories about the history of the text. This "Lost Chapter" does not explain how Paul escaped or was released from arrest to take up new travels.

History
The text made its first appearance in London in 1871. According to the editor, it was translated in the late 18th century by the French naturalist Sonnini de Manoncourt from a "Greek manuscript discovered in the archives at Constantinople and presented to him by the Sultan Abdoul Achmet". It was found hidden in an English translation of Sonnini's Voyage en Grèce et en Turquie in the library of Sir John Newport, MP (1756–1843) after his death. However, no trace of any such manuscript has been found, and from internal evidence, mainstream philology considers it to most likely be a fraud, thus it is classed among the modern pseudepigrapha.

It is available in a 1982 edition by E. Raymond Capt from Artisan Publishers, Muskogee, which is a publisher specializing in evangelical fringe subjects.

Purpose and influence
The purpose of the book was likely to support Anglo-Israelism.  The book has not found attention in recent mainstream publications and is not mentioned on the website of the British-Israel-World Federation. The influence of that movement has declined.

See also 

 St. Paul in Britain

References

External links 
"Strange New Gospels" by Edgar Godspeed

1871 books
19th-century Christian texts
Apocryphal Acts
British Israelism
Literary forgeries
Modern pseudepigrapha
English-language books